Stiffed was an American punk rock band from Philadelphia, Pennsylvania. 

They incorporated both New Wave and No Wave elements into their work. Founded by vocalist Santi White also known as Santigold, the original band lineup also included guitarist Matt Schleck, bassist Chris Shar and drummer Chuck Treece. The band's "stripped-raw rhythm and eerie vocals [...] created so much buzz in the underground rock scenes in New York and Philadelphia that record producer Ryko and publicity hotshots Girlie Action (the White Stripes and Ryan Adams are also clients) approached the band hoping to distribute and represent Stiffed's music." Their initial EP Sex Sells was released in 2003 on Coolhunter records, and their debut album Burned Again, produced by Darryl Jennifer of Bad Brains, was released in 2005. The band helped launch White's solo career under the stage name Santigold.

References

External links
 Stiffed on MySpace

American new wave musical groups
American punk rock groups
American ska punk musical groups